Dr. Sikandar Ali Mandhro (7 July 1943 – 11 June 2022) was a Pakistani politician hailing from Badin District, Sindh, Pakistan, who belonged to Pakistan Peoples Party Parliamentarians. He served as Minister of Health, Religious Affairs, Zakat & Ushr, Member of the assembly and Member of the Finance Committee in the Provincial Assembly of Sindh. He was also the Member of the Senate of Pakistan since March 2018 until his death on 11 June 2022.

Education and political career 
Dr. Sikandar Ali Mandhro was born in Badin District. He was a senior politician. He achieved his Bachelor of Medicine, Bachelor of Surgery (MBBS) and MA (Economics) from University of Sindh and MCPS (Medicine) from College of Physicians and Surgeons Pakistan.

Political career 1993–2007 
Sikandar Ali Mandhro belonged to constituency PS-58 (Badin-II) (Old Badin-IV). He had served as a Member in Provincial Assembly of Sindh multiple times from 1993 to 1996, from 1997 to 1999, from 2002 to 2007.

Political career 2008–2013 
In election, 2008 he again served as Member in Provincial Assembly of Sindh from 2008 to 2013 from the constituency PS-58 (Badin-II). He was also serving as Member of several committees such as: Standing Committee on Finance and Inter Provincial Coordination, Standing Committee on Health, Standing Committee on Irrigation and Power, Standing Committee on Planning and Development (Chairperson), Finance Committee, Special Committee and others from 2008 to 2013.

Political career 2013–2016 
Dr. Sikandar Ali Mandhro served as Minister of Health, Religious Affairs, Zakat & Ushr, Member of the assembly and Member of the Finance Committee in the Provincial Assembly of Sindh. He also served as Minister for Parliamentary Affairs and Environment from 2013 to 2016.

References

External links
 

1943 births
2022 deaths
Sindhi people
Pakistan People's Party politicians
Sindh MPAs 2013–2018
People from Sindh
People from Badin District